Kaheem Anthony Parris (born 6 January 2000) is a Jamaican professional footballer who plays for Ukrainian Premier League side Dynamo Kyiv as a winger.

Early life

Originally from Saint Ann Parish on the north coast of Jamaica, Parris attended Dinthill Technical High School.

Club career
In 2017, Parris made his National Premier League debut for Cavalier. In January 2018, he scored three goals in three consecutive games.

In September 2019, Parris was loaned to the Slovenian top division side NK Domžale. However, he made only one appearance for the club and soon left on loan to Slovenian second division club NK Krka. In July 2020, Parris signed a new season-long loan deal with Krka. He was the top goalscorer of the Slovenian second division with 16 goals.

In July 2021, Parris signed a two-year contract with Slovenian top division team FC Koper.

On 2 September 2022, Parris signed with Ukrainian Premier League side Dynamo Kyiv for a club-record transfer fee, believed to be over €1 million. He signed a four-year contract with Dynamo, with an option for another year.

International career

Parris made his Jamaica under-17 team debut in 2016 in CFU qualifying. Parris also played in the 2017 CONCACAF U17 final rounds. He was part of the Jamaica under-20 team at the 2018 CONCACAF U-20 Championship, and made his senior national team debut in August 2017.

He has also played for the under-23 team at the 2019 Pan American Games.

References

2000 births
Living people
Sportspeople from Kingston, Jamaica
Jamaican footballers
Jamaican expatriate footballers
Jamaica youth international footballers
Jamaica under-20 international footballers
Jamaica international footballers
Association football wingers
Cavalier F.C. players
NK Domžale players
NK Krka players
FC Koper players
FC Dynamo Kyiv players
National Premier League players
Slovenian PrvaLiga players
Slovenian Second League players
Ukrainian Premier League players
Footballers at the 2019 Pan American Games
Pan American Games competitors for Jamaica
Expatriate footballers in Slovenia
Jamaican expatriate sportspeople in Slovenia
Expatriate footballers in Ukraine
Jamaican expatriate sportspeople in Ukraine